is a town located in Ito District, Wakayama Prefecture, Japan. , the town had an estimated population of 2,812 in 1575 households and a population density of 21 persons per km². The town is known as the headquarters of the Shingon sect of Japanese Buddhism.

Geography 
Kōya is located near the prefectural border at the northeastern end of Wakayama Prefecture, on the heavily-forest plateau of Mount Koya

Neighbouring municipalities 
Wakayama Prefecture
 Hashimoto
 Katsuragi
 Kudoyama
Nara Prefecture
 Nosegawa

Climate
Kōya has a Humid continental climate (Köppen Dfa/Cfa) characterized by warm summers and cool winters with light to no snowfall.

Demographics
Per Japanese census data, the population of Kōya has declined steadily over the last 70 years.

History
The area of the modern town of Kōya was within ancient Kii Province and was long associated with the Shingon Buddhist temple complex on Mount Kōya, which was founded in 816AD. The village of Kōya was established with the creation of the modern municipalities system on April 1, 1889, and was raised to town status on November 1, 1918. The village of Fuki was annexed by Kōya on June 1, 1958

Government
Kōya has a mayor-council form of government with a directly elected mayor and a unicameral town council of 10 members. Kōya collectively with the town of Kudyama, contributes one member to the Wakayama Prefectural Assembly. In terms of national politics, the town is part of Wakayama 2nd district of the lower house of the Diet of Japan.

Economy
The economy of Kōya is centered on tourism. Since there are many temples, there are many people involved in Buddhist professions such as monks, and there are also many related tourism industry workers such as innkeepers, souvenir shops, and Buddhist equipment stores.

Education
Kōya has three public elementary schools and one public middle school operated by the town government, one public high school operated by the Wakayama Prefectural Board of Education. Koyasan University, a private university affiliated with Shingon Buddhism is located in the town.

Transportation

Railway 
 Nankai Electric Railway – Nankai Kōya Line
  -  - 
 Nankai Electric Railway – Nankai Cable Line
 -

Highways

Local attractions
Sacred Sites and Pilgrimage Routes in the Kii Mountain Range
Mount Kōya
Kongōbu-ji
Kongō Sanmai-in
Koyasan Reihōkan

References

External links

Kōya official website 

Towns in Wakayama Prefecture
Kōya, Wakayama